An additive process, in probability theory, is a cadlag, continuous in probability stochastic process with independent increments.
An additive process is the generalization of a Lévy process (a Lévy process is an additive process with identically distributed increments). An example of an additive process is a Brownian motion with a time-dependent drift.
The additive process was introduced by Paul Lévy in 1937.

There are applications of the additive process in quantitative finance (this family of processes can capture important features of the implied volatility) and in digital image processing.

Definition 
An additive process is a generalization of a Lévy process obtained relaxing the hypothesis of identically distributed increments. Thanks to this feature an additive process can describe more complex phenomenons than a  Lévy process.

A stochastic process  on  such that   almost surely is an additive process if it satisfy the following hypothesis:
It has independent increments.
It is continuous in probability.

Main properties

Independent increments 
A stochastic process  has independent increments if and only if for any   the random variable  is independent from the random variable .

Continuity in probability 
A stochastic process  is continuous in probability if, and only if, for any

Lévy–Khintchine representation 
There is a strong link between additive process and infinitely divisible distributions.

 is called drift term,  covariance matrix and   Lévy measure.
It is possible to write explicitly the additive process characteristic function using the Lévy–Khintchine formula:

 

Existence and uniqueness in law of additive process
The following result together with the Lévy–Khintchine formula characterizes the additive process.

Then, its infinitely divisible distribution is such that:
 For all ,  is a positive definite matrix.

Conversely for family of infinitely divisible distributions characterized by a generating triplet   that satisfies 1, 2 and 3, it exists an additive process   with this distribution.

Subclass of additive process

Additive Logistic Process
Family of additive processes with generalized logistic distribution. Their 5 parameters characteristic function is 
 
Two subcases of additive logistic process are the symmetric logistic additive process with standard logistic distribution and the conjugate-power Dagum additive process with Dagum distribution.
 
The function  can always be chosen s.t. the additive process is a martingale.

Additive Normal Tempered Stable Process
Extension of the Lévy normal tempered stable processes; some well-known Lévy normal tempered stable processes have normal-inverse Gaussian distribution and the variance-gamma distribution. 
 
where
 
The function  can always be chosen s.t. the additive process is a  martingale.

Additive Subordinator
An additive subordinator is a semimartingale (thanks to the fact that it is not decreasing) and it is always possible to rewrite its Laplace transform as

 

It is possible to use additive subordinator to time-change a Lévy process obtaining a new class of additive processes.

Sato Process 
An additive self-similar process  is called Sato process.

An example is the variance gamma SSD, the Sato process obtained starting from the variance gamma process.

The characteristic function of the Variance gamma at time  is

 

The characteristic function of the variance gamma SSD is

Simulation 
Simulation of Additive process is computationally efficient thanks to the independence of increments. The additive process increments can be simulated separately and simulation can also be parallelized.

Jump simulation
	Jump simulation is a generalization to the class of  additive processes of the jump simulation technique developed for Lévy  processes.
	The method is based on truncating small jumps below a certain threshold and  simulating the finite number of independent jumps. 
	Moreover, Gaussian approximation can be applied to replace small jumps with a diffusive term. It is also possible to use the Ziggurat algorithm to speed up the simulation of jumps.

Characteristic function inversion
Simulation of Lévy process via characteristic function inversion is a well established technique in the literature.
This technique  can be extended to additive processes. The key idea is obtaining an approximation of the cumulative distribution function (CDF) by inverting the characteristic function. The inversion speed is enhanced by the use of the Fast Fourier transform. Once the approximation of the CDF is available is it possible to simulate an additive process increment just by simulating a uniform random variable. The method has similar computational cost as simulating a standard geometric Brownian motion.

Applications

Quantitative finance 
Lévy process is used to model the log-returns of market prices. Unfortunately, the stationarity  of the increments does not reproduce correctly market data. A Lévy process fit well call option and put option prices (implied volatility) for a single expiration date but is unable to fit options prices with different maturities (volatility surface). The additive process introduces a deterministic non-stationarity that allows it to fit all expiration dates.

A four-parameters Sato process (self-similar additive process) can reproduce correctly the volatility surface (3% error on the S&P 500  equity market). This order of magnitude of error is usually obtained using models with 6-10 parameters to fit market data. A self-similar process correctly describes market data because of its flat skewness and excess kurtosis; empirical studies had observed this behavior in market skewness and excess kurtosis.
Some of the processes that fit option prices with a 3% error are  VGSSD, NIGSSD, MXNRSSD obtained from variance gamma process, normal inverse Gaussian process and Meixner process.

Additive normal tempered stable processes fit  accurately equity market data ( error below 0.8% on the S&P 500  equity market) specifically for short maturities. These family of processes reproduces very well also the equity market implied volatility skew.
There is statistical evidence that  

Lévy subordination is used to construct new Lévy processes (for example variance gamma process and normal inverse Gaussian process).  There is a large number of financial applications of processes constructed by Lévy subordination. An additive process built via additive subordination maintains the analytical tractability of a process built via Lévy subordination but it reflects better the time-inhomogeneus structure of market data. Additive subordination is applied to the commodity market and to VIX options.

Digital image processing
An estimator based on the minimum of an additive process can be applied to image processing. Such estimator aims to distinguish between real signal and noise in the picture pixels.

References

Sources
 

 
Probability theory